El Salitre is a small wetland, one of the wetlands of Bogotá. It is located within Salitre Park, close to Salitre Mágico, an amusement park north of Simón Bolívar Park in the locality Barrios Unidos of the Colombian capital Bogotá.

Flora and fauna

Birds 
In El Salitre, 81 species of birds have been recorded.

See also 

Biodiversity of Colombia, Bogotá savanna, Thomas van der Hammen Natural Reserve
Wetlands of Bogotá, Salitre Mágico

References

Further reading

External links 
  Fundación Humedales de Bogotá
  Conozca los 15 humedales de Bogotá - El Tiempo

Wetlands of Bogotá